William Averell (1556–1605) was an English pamphleteer.

William Averell may also refer to:
William D. Averell (1853–1928), conchologist and editor of The Nautilus
William W. Averell (1832–1900), Union general in the American Civil War

See also
William Averell Harriman (1891–1986), American politician, businessman, and diplomat